The Digital Intervention is an experimental electronic duo formed by British electro-acoustic composer, sound engineer, former Mute artist Paul Kendall and French-born British composer, vocalist Olivia Louvel.
They began to work together in 2002 whilst in Paris. Their first collaborative track was 'La Louve'.

Paul Kendall was responsible for Mute Records 'Parallel Series' which he set up in the 1990s, aiming to bridge the gap between classical electronic music and rock electronic music. 
'Parallel series' moved to the French Ici, d'ailleurs... label. 
'The Last Writes' was broadcast on Mixing It, BBC Radio 3. 
The track "Coma Idyllique" features arrangements by Alan Wilder.

Discography
LPs
 'Capture' (2003) CD. Ici D'Ailleurs  Also contributing to the album 'Capture' are Alan Wilder string arrangement on track 6, "Coma Idyllique" Sebastien Libolt who plays accordion on the cover of 1930s song by French chanteuse Frehel, 'La Coco' Dimitri Tikovoi bass on Essence, Coma Idyllique

Compilations
 Oumupo vol. 3. Rubin Steiner & Luz (2004) CD digipack with booklet. Track remixed 'La Coco'. Ici D'Ailleurs 
 Oumupo vol.1 The Third Eye Foundation (2004) CD digipack with booklet. Track remixed 'Coma Idyllique' Ici D'Ailleurs

Participatory Project
 'When The Sea Will Rise II' (2016) Acoustic Cameras invites sound artists and composers to annex the real-time flow of webcams located around the world. A proposal by Christophe Demarthe, co-edited by Optical Sound and la manufacture des Cactées

Selected shows
 2004 Cafe De La Danse,Paris (F) Festival Ici D'Ailleurs 
 2004 Le Grand Mix, Tourcoing (F) Festival Ici D'Ailleurs 
 2005 Batofar, Paris (F) 
 2005 The Sprawl, London (UK) 
 2009 Ososphere Festival, Strasburg (F),"Echos Flottants", a sonic cruise curated by Pierre Belouin, performance with Black Sifichi

References

External links
 The Digital Intervention for Acoustic Cameras

British electronic musicians
Electronic music duos